Pau Perez-Sales is a psychiatrist and director of the Universidad Complutense de Madrid's Post-Doctoral Degree in Mental Health in Political Violence and Catastrophe. He is also affiliated with the Department of Psychiatry Hospital La Paz in Madrid and Director of SiR[a], Centre for research, forensic documentation and rehabilitation of ill-treatment and torture victims.

Education 
Pau Perez-Sales holds a degree in medicine at the University of Barcelona and did a speciality in psychiatry at Hospital La Paz, Madrid, In 1994, he received his PhD in Psychiatry from the Autonomous University of Madrid.

Research and career 
Pau Pérez-Sales is former Chair of the World Psychiatric Association's Section on Psychological Consequences of Persecution and Torture. He has done extensive research on operationalising the scientific research on torture and psychological torture. He defined the concept of Torturing Environments, and developed a set of tools to quantify and study them.

As a forensic expert, he has worked on credibility assessment of torture allegations and protocols for documenting psychological torture including sleep deprivation, the use of threats as ill-treatment and torture, hunger as torture, use of internet and communications technologies and others.

His other research interests include psychotherapy in individual and community trauma, transcultural psychiatry post-traumatic factors and resilience. He developed the VIVO questionnaire as an integrative instrument for assessing the impact of trauma experiences on identity and worldviews, and has trained and directed research in over 20 nations.

With more than 20 years of professional experience, Pau Perez-Sales played a pivotal part in Latin America's Psychology of Liberation movement, lived and worked in Nicaragua, Guatemala, Mexico, El Salvador, Chile and Colombia working with grassroots organisation authoring a vast production of books and papers related to forced-disappearance, exhumation of mass graves and truth and reparation policies.

He worked as a consultant for the World Health Organization, the Inter Agency Standing Committee group on Mental Health and Psychosocial Support in Emergency Settings, MH-GAP Intervention Guide Rapid Assessment in Emergencies Program and coordinated MHPSS programs for Doctors of the World and Mediciens Sans Frontier.

As a forensic expert, he has documented individual and collective torture, including the case of Ester Quintana, Julian Assange, Referendum 1 d'Octubre, Santa Barbara Massacre (Peru) among others.

Memberships 
Pau Perez-Sales was an elected member of the Board of the International Society for Health and Human Rights (ISHHR) and member of the Steering Committee of the International Working Group on Principles on Effective Interviewing for Investigations and Information Gathering, Founding member and Past President of the Human Rights Section of the Spanish Association of Neuropsychiatry.

Pau Perez-Sales is Editor-in-Chief of Torture and former Associate Editor of Intervention International Journal of Mental Health and Psychosocial support in Conflict Affected Areas.

Main Books

 Trauma, Culpa y Duelo. Hacia una psicoterapia integradora (Trauma, Guilt and Grief. Towards an integrative psychotherapy) 
Psychological Torture: Definition, Evaluation, and Measurement. (Spanish Version: Tortura Psicológica. Definición, Evaluación y Medida

Publications
 Perez-Sales, P., Fernandez-Liria, A., Florence, B., & Ventevogel, P. (2011). Integrating mental health care into existing systems of health care : during and after complex humanitarian emergencies.
Identity and Trauma in Adolescents Within the Context of Political Violence: A Psychosocial and Communitarian View.
Vivo Questionnaire: A Measure of Human Worldviews and Identity in Trauma, Crisis, and Loss—Validation and Preliminary Findings.
If You Could Only Choose Five Psychotropic Medicines: Updating the Interagency Emergency Health Kit.
From sexualized torture and gender-based torture to genderized torture: The urgent need for a conceptual evolution.

References

External links

Pau Pérez Sales publications indexed in ResearchGate
Pau Pérez-Sales website

Spanish psychiatrists
Academic staff of the Complutense University of Madrid
Autonomous University of Madrid alumni
University of Barcelona alumni
Year of birth missing (living people)
Living people